Richard Winston "Dickie" Moore (January 6, 1931 – December 19, 2015) was a Canadian professional hockey player, successful businessman and community philanthropist. He twice won the Art Ross Trophy as the National Hockey League's leading scorer and was inducted into the Hockey Hall of Fame. Moore spent much of his career with the Montreal Canadiens, but also played briefly with the Toronto Maple Leafs and St. Louis Blues. In 2017 Moore was named one of the '100 Greatest NHL Players' in history.

Career
Moore played left wing with the Montreal Canadiens from 1951 to 1963. He started playing with the Montreal Jr. Royals for three seasons from 1947 to 1950, and made his debut with the Montreal Canadiens in the middle of the 1951–52 season. Moore had played on two Memorial Cup winners, one with the Montreal Royals in 1949 and Montreal Junior Canadiens the following year. In the late 1940s Canadiens GM Frank Selke Sr. anointed him Canada's best junior.

He was known for his hard accurate shot and his ability to stickhandle the puck. He twice won the Art Ross Trophy as the league's leading scorer. Moore broke Gordie Howe's record of 95 total points in a regular season play with 41 goals and 55 assists. He often played on the same line as Henri Richard and Maurice Richard.

Moore won the Stanley Cup for the first time in 1953 and was a member of the Montreal Canadiens team that won five consecutive cups from 1956 to 1960.

During his 1957–58 season with the Canadiens, Moore suffered a broken wrist during a collision with Detroit defenceman Marcel Pronovost which threatened to cut short a scoring championship year. Journalist Red Fisher described what happened next: Moore, the competitor, wanted to win the Art Ross. He had his eye on the prize, but Moore, the team man, had other ideas. One night, when the Canadiens were travelling on the train, he asked for a meeting with coach Toe Blake and his linemates, Maurice and Henri Richard. At the time, Henri was Dickie's closest pursuer in the scoring race. Dickie told them he could still play with his wrist in a cast, but for how long? And as long as he played with an injury that would sideline most players, how much could he contribute to the line? "It’s not fair to Henri," Moore told Blake. "It’s not fair not to allow him  to win the scoring title." The meeting lasted no more than a few minutes. It ended abruptly when Maurice and Henri told Blake: "There’s no damned way he’s going off the line." Moore remained on the line. He played with his wrist imprisoned in a cast for the second half of the season. He won the Art Ross with an NHL-leading 36 goals and 48 assists in a 70-game season. Henri finished four points behind. Moore won it again in 1958–59 with 41 goals and 55 assists.

He retired following the 1962–63 season, but came back after a year's hiatus to play for the Toronto Maple Leafs. Another three-year break saw Moore return to play 45 games for the St. Louis Blues. The 37-year-old went out with a bang, picking up 14 postseason points as the Blues made it into the Finals in their inaugural campaign.

In 1974, Moore was inducted into the Hockey Hall of Fame.  In 1998, he was ranked number 31 on The Hockey News' list of the 100 Greatest Hockey Players.

Later life
Following his retirement from hockey, Moore became a successful businessman, operating an equipment and tools rental business for construction in Montreal, Ottawa and Toronto.

On November 12, 2005, the Canadiens retired the uniform number 12 in honour of both Moore and Yvan Cournoyer.

On August 27, 2006, Moore suffered neck, spine and rib injuries when his car was hit by a truck in Montreal. He was trapped in the car for 45 minutes before rescue. He died on December 19, 2015, in Montreal at the age of 84.

Personal
Moore had three children: Richard, Lianne and John. In 1973, Richard died at the age of 16 in a car accident. Richard had been attending Malcolm Campbell High School in Montreal. The Dickie Moore Memorial Awards are presented annually in memory of former Kentville Minor Hockey player Dickie Moore Jr.

Awards and records
NHL first team All-Star — 1958, 1959
NHL second team All-Star — 1961
Played in NHL All-Star Game 6 times
Art Ross Trophy — 1958, 1959
Stanley Cup Champions — 1953, 1956, 1957, 1958, 1959, 1960 (6) 
Inducted into Hockey Hall of Fame in 1974
Most regular season points in one NHL season - 96 (1959, surpassed by Bobby Hull in 1966 (97 points), current record held by Wayne Gretzky who scored 215 points in 1986)
 In January, 2017, Moore was part of the first group of players to be named one of the '100 Greatest NHL Players' in history.

Career statistics

* Stanley Cup Champion.

References

External links
 

1931 births
2015 deaths
Art Ross Trophy winners
Buffalo Bisons (AHL) players
Canadian ice hockey forwards
Hockey Hall of Fame inductees
Ice hockey people from Montreal
Montreal Canadiens players
Montreal Junior Canadiens players
National Hockey League players with retired numbers
St. Louis Blues players
Stanley Cup champions
Toronto Maple Leafs players